The Church of Saint Anne (commonly known as St. Anne Church, or Saint Anne's) is an Irish Roman Catholic Parish in the Archdiocese of Philadelphia.  The church was founded in 1845.   The church serves the communities of Fishtown, Port Richmond, and Kensington.

The school, which was founded in 1854, had about 1,000 students in the 1970s. It was closed in June 2011, due to falling enrollment. NHS Human Services School at St. Annes, which caters to children with autism, opened in its place in 2015.

References

Roman Catholic churches in Pennsylvania
Roman Catholic churches in Philadelphia
Roman Catholic churches completed in 1845
1845 establishments in Pennsylvania
19th-century Roman Catholic church buildings in the United States